Chris Johnson (born July 17, 1985) is an American professional basketball player for the Taipei Fubon Braves of the P. League+. He played college basketball for the LSU Tigers before having multiple stints in the NBA between 2011 and 2013.

High school and college
Born in Washington, D.C., Johnson attended Colonial Beach High School in Westmoreland County, Virginia, where he averaged 22.2 points and 12.5 rebounds in his final season. He was then part of Laurinburg Institute's prep school national championship team under coach Chris Chaney in 2005. He averaged 8.6 points, 3.9 rebounds and 2.7 blocks per game as a senior and shot 42 percent from three-point range.

Johnson played college basketball for the LSU Tigers from 2005 to 2009. In 85 games, he made 59 starts and averaged 7.2 points, 5.2 rebounds and 2.0 blocks in 20.4 minutes per game. With 176 blocks, he finished his four-year career as the second all-time leader in blocked shots at LSU behind Shaquille O'Neal (412).

Professional career

2009–10 season
After going undrafted in the 2009 NBA draft, Johnson joined the New Jersey Nets for the NBA Summer League. He started the 2009–10 season in Turkey with Aliağa Petkim before ending the season in Poland with Turów Zgorzelec.

2010–11 season
After a quick pre-season stint with the Boston Celtics, Johnson joined the Dakota Wizards of the NBA D-League. In 35 games for the Wizards during the 2010–11 season, he averaged 16.2 points, 9.2 rebounds, 1.3 assists and 2.8 blocks per game.

On January 24, 2011, Johnson signed a 10-day contract with the Portland Trail Blazers. A month later, he signed a 10-day contract with the Celtics. On March 14, he re-signed with the Trail Blazers for the remainder of the 2010–11 season.

2011–12 season
During the 2011 NBA lockout, Johnson played for and won a championship in the Dominican Republic with Leones de Santo Domingo of the Liga Nacional de Baloncesto (LNB). Following the lockout, he re-joined the Trail Blazers for the 2011–12 season.

On March 15, 2012, Johnson was waived by the Trail Blazers. On March 20, he was claimed off waivers by the New Orleans Hornets. On April 18, 2012, he was waived by the Hornets.

2012–13 season
After playing for the NBA D-League Select Team in the Las Vegas Summer League and spending pre-season with the Minnesota Timberwolves, Johnson joined the Santa Cruz Warriors of the NBA D-League for the 2012–13 season.

On January 19, 2013, Johnson signed a 10-day contract with the Timberwolves. He went on to sign a second 10-day contract and a rest-of-season contract with Minnesota.

2013–14 season
After playing for the Timberwolves in the Las Vegas Summer League and spending pre-season with the team, Johnson was waived on October 26, 2013. In November 2013, he moved to China to play for the Zhejiang Lions.

2014–15 season
After spending pre-season with the Miami Heat, Johnson returned to China for the start of the 2014–15 season to play for the Zhejiang Golden Bulls as a short-term injury replacement for Charles Gaines. Following the return of Gaines, he left the Golden Bulls in mid-December after appearing in 11 games.

On January 20, 2015, Johnson signed with Turkish team Türk Telekom for the rest of the season.

2015–16 season
On September 28, 2015, Johnson signed with the Cleveland Cavaliers. However, he was later waived by the Cavaliers on October 17 after appearing in four preseason games.

On February 15, 2016, Johnson signed with Capitanes de Arecibo of the Puerto Rican League.

2016–17 season
In July 2016, Johnson played for the Portland Trail Blazers in the Las Vegas Summer League.

2017–18 season
Between June and October 2017, Johnson played in China for the Anhui Dragons of the NBL. He then moved to Croatia for the 2017–18 season to play for Cedevita Zagreb.

2018–19 season
Between October 2018 and January 2019, Johnson played in Lebanon for Homenetmen Beirut B.C. In April 2019, he played for Shabab Al Ahli during the FIBA Asia Champions Cup GBA Qualifiers.

2019–20 season
Johnson returned to Shabab Al Ahli for the 2019–10 season. In January 2020, he moved to Japan to play for SeaHorses Mikawa.

2020–21 season
In March 2021, Johnson had a short stint in Bahrain with Al-Muharraq SC.

On April 20, 2021, Johnson signed with the Auckland Huskies for the 2021 New Zealand NBL season. He left the Huskies on July 8 to return to the United States to play in the Big3 league. He averaged 20.1 points, 11.0 rebounds, 2.9 assists and 1.7 blocks per game with the Huskies.

2021–22 season
After a stint in the Dominican Republic with Parque Hostos, Johnson moved to Saudia Arabia in December 2021 to play for Al Nasr. In 15 games, he averaged 25.1 points, 15.7 rebounds, 3.7 assists and 1.7 blocks per game.

On April 21, 2022, Johnson signed with the Auckland Tuatara for the 2022 New Zealand NBL season, returning to the rebranded Auckland franchise. He left the team mid-season to return to the Big3 league, but then returned to the Tuatara for the final regular season game and finals.

2022–23 season
On August 23, 2022, Johnson signed with Taipei Fubon Braves of the P. League+.

NBA career statistics

Regular season

|-
| align="left" | 
| align="left" | Portland
| 10 || 1 || 10.6 || .389 || .000 || .722 || 2.7 || .2 || .3 || .6 || 2.7
|-
| align="left" | 
| align="left" | Boston
| 4 || 0 || 8.0 || .667 || .000 || 1.000 || 1.3 || .3 || .0 || .8 || 1.5
|-
| align="left" | 
| align="left" | Portland
| 20 || 0 || 4.7 || .478 || .000 || .833 || .9 || .1 || .1 || .4 || 1.6
|-
| align="left" | 
| align="left" | New Orleans
| 7 || 0 || 11.7 || .500 || .000 || .714 || 3.1 || .1 || .7 || .1 || 3.3
|-
| align="left" | 
| align="left" | Minnesota
| 30 || 0 || 9.5 || .640 || .000 || .618 || 2.0 || .3 || .2 || .9 || 3.9
|- class="sortbottom"
| style="text-align:center;" colspan="2"| Career
| 71 || 1 || 8.4 || .562 || .000 || .699 || 1.9 || .2 || .2 || .6 || 2.9

Playoffs

|-
| align="left" | 2011
| align="left" | Portland
| 4 || 0 || 4.8 || 1.000 || .000 || 1.000 || 1.3 || .0 || .0 || .5 || 1.0
|- class="sortbottom"
| style="text-align:center;" colspan="2"| Career
| 4 || 0 || 4.8 || 1.000 || .000 || 1.000 || 1.3 || .0 || .0 || .5 || 1.0

Personal life
Johnson's wife Tammy is from Takapuna, New Zealand. The couple have twins that were born in 2020.

References

External links
 
 LSU Tigers bio
 ESPN.com Profile
 RealGM.com Profile

1985 births
Living people
ABA League players
Aliağa Petkim basketball players
American expatriate basketball people in Bahrain
American expatriate basketball people in China
American expatriate basketball people in Croatia
American expatriate basketball people in the Dominican Republic
American expatriate basketball people in Japan
American expatriate basketball people in Lebanon
American expatriate basketball people in New Zealand
American expatriate basketball people in Poland
American expatriate basketball people in Turkey
American men's basketball players
American men's 3x3 basketball players
Anhui Dragons players
Auckland Huskies players
Auckland Tuatara basketball players
Basketball players from Washington, D.C.
Big3 players
Boston Celtics players
Capitanes de Arecibo players
Centers (basketball)
Dakota Wizards players
KK Cedevita players
LSU Tigers basketball players
Minnesota Timberwolves players
New Orleans Hornets players
People from Colonial Beach, Virginia
Portland Trail Blazers players
Power forwards (basketball)
Santa Cruz Warriors players
SeaHorses Mikawa players
Türk Telekom B.K. players
Turów Zgorzelec players
Undrafted National Basketball Association players
Zhejiang Golden Bulls players
Zhejiang Lions players